Johann Friedrich Wolff (1778- 1806) was a German physician, botanist, entomologist and natural history illustrator.
He wrote and illustrated Commentatio de Lemna. Altdorfii et Norimbergae (1801), Icones Cimicum descriptionibus illustratae. Erlangen 1800-1811 and some short papers.
Wolff is the author of several genera and species of Hemiptera.

References 

1778 births
1806 deaths
18th-century German botanists
German entomologists